Martorell is a Catalan surname. Notable people with the name include:

 Antonio Martorell (born 1939), Puerto Rican painter, graphic artist, writer and radio and television personality
 Antonio Martorell Sastre (born 1978), Spanish Paralympic swimmer
 Bernat Martorell (died 1452), Catalan painter
 Chanchanit Martorell, Thai activist, educator, urban planner, and community development practitioner
 Federico Martorell (born 1981), Argentine football centre back
 Joan Martorell (1833–1906), Catalan architect and designer
 Joanot Martorell (1413–1468), Valencian knight and author
 María Martorell (born 1942), Spanish politician
 Miguel Martorell (born 1937), Spanish cyclist
 Oriol Martorell i Codina (1927–1996), Spanish musical director, pedagogue and professor of history
 Reynaldo Martorell, American nutritionist and professor

Catalan-language surnames